Agaricus excellens (French: Psaliote Excellente, German: Riesen-Egerling) is a rare mushroom in the genus Agaricus. It is native to Europe.

Description

 Cap: It is whitish yellow in color. Spread over 10–15 cm across, it is convex and a bit flat, yellowing slightly at the center especially with age, and densely covered in minute fibrous scales of the same colour. It feels silky.
 Stem / Stipe: Stem is 100–140 x 20–35mm, white in color; the ring is thick and white. The underside is scaly or fibrillar.
 Gills: The gills are pale-pink and free.
 Spores and microscopic features : Spore print is purplish black. Spores are elliptic, measuring 9–12 x 5–7µ.
 Flesh and smell: The cap flesh is reddish-white. It tastes sweet and a bit like mushroom, smells slightly of aniseed and almond.

Habitat
It is commonly found in coniferous and deciduous areas and grows during late autumn to summer amongst grass in open woodland, especially spruce. It is typically found at an altitude of 0 to 914 meters (0 to 3000 feet).

See also
List of Agaricus species

References

excellens
Fungi described in 1952
Fungi of Europe